Robert Carl Anderson (September 29, 1935 – March 12, 2015) was an American professional baseball player and right-handed pitcher who appeared in 246 games in Major League Baseball (MLB) between  and  for the Chicago Cubs and Detroit Tigers. Born in East Chicago, Indiana, he graduated from Hammond High School and attended both Michigan State University and Western Michigan University.

Career overview
Anderson signed with Chicago in 1954 and reached the Open-Classification Pacific Coast League in 1956 as a member of the Cubs' top farm team, the Los Angeles Angels. He had a stellar season as a relief pitcher, working in 70 games and winning a dozen, for the PCL champion Angels. In , he made the Cubs' staff for good and became a full-time starting pitcher, posting a 21–24 record over the next two seasons in 66 assignments, with 12 complete games and his only MLB shutout, a 3–0 six-hit triumph against the pennant-contending Milwaukee Braves on August 24, 1959.

In 1961, he transitioned back to a bullpen role, and received only 19 more starting assignments over the rest of his MLB career. He was traded to Detroit after the  season. Reunited with Bob Scheffing, his manager with the PCL Angels and the 1957–1959 Cubs, Anderson got into 32 games for the 1963 Tigers and posted the only winning season of his career, as he captured three of four decisions. He was dealt along with Rocky Colavito and $50,000 from the Tigers to the Kansas City Athletics for Jerry Lumpe, Dave Wickersham and Ed Rakow on November 18, . He did not make the 1964 Athletics' roster and spent the year back in minor league baseball before leaving the game.

During his MLB career, he won 36 games, lost 46, and compiled an earned run average of 4.26. He was credited with 15 complete games. In 840 innings pitched, he allowed 858 hits and 319 bases on balls with 502 strikeouts.

Involved in unusual 1959 play
Anderson was involved in one of Major League Baseball's most unusual and weirdest plays of all time in its long history, which occurred during a game played on June 30, 1959, at Wrigley Field between the Cubs and St. Louis Cardinals.

Anderson was pitching and Stan Musial was at the plate with a count of 3–1. Anderson's next pitch was errant, evading catcher Sammy Taylor and rolling all the way to the backstop. The home plate umpire Vic Delmore called ball four, however Anderson and Taylor contended Musial had foul tipped the ball and because the ball was still in play, and due to Delmore being embroiled in an argument with the catcher and pitcher, Musial took it upon himself to try for second base. Seeing that Musial was breaking for second, Cubs third baseman Alvin Dark ran to the backstop to retrieve the ball, however that ball wound up in the hands of field announcer Pat Pieper, but Dark ended up getting it back anyway.

Absentmindedly, however, Delmore pulled out a new ball and gave it to Taylor. Anderson finally noticed that Musial was trying for second, took the new ball, and threw it to second baseman Tony Taylor at which Anderson's throw flew high over Tony Taylor's head into centerfield. Dark, at the same time that Anderson threw the new ball, threw the original ball to shortstop Ernie Banks. Musial, though, did not see Dark's throw and only noticing Anderson's ball fly over the second baseman's head then tried to go to third base, however, on his way over there, was tagged by Banks, and after a delay was ruled out. Oddly, in the final accounting, this most unusual and different play made no difference in the result, a 4–1 victory for the visiting Cardinals.

References

External links

1935 births
2015 deaths
Águilas Cibaeñas players
American expatriate baseball players in the Dominican Republic
Baseball players from Indiana
Cedar Rapids Indians players
Chicago Cubs players
Dallas Rangers players
Des Moines Bruins players
Detroit Tigers players
Fort Worth Cats players
Lewiston Broncs players
Los Angeles Angels (minor league) players
Major League Baseball pitchers
Michigan State Spartans baseball players
Michigan State University alumni
Sportspeople from East Chicago, Indiana
Portland Beavers players
Western Michigan Broncos baseball players
Western Michigan University alumni